Volodymyr Plishka (born August 2, 1991) is a Ukrainian footballer playing with FC Ukraine United in the Ontario Soccer League.

Playing career 
Plishka began his career in 2008 with Nyva Ternopil in the Ukrainian Second League. He briefly played in the amateur leagues with FC Agribusiness in 2010. The following the season he returned to the Second League to Ternopil, and had stints with FC Dynamo Khmelnytskyi, and FC Enerhiya Nova Kakhovka. In 2015, he played abroad in the Canadian Soccer League with Toronto Atomic FC. In 2019, he played in the Second Division with FC Vorkuta B. 

In 2021, he played in the Ontario Soccer League with FC Ukraine United.

References 

1991 births
Living people
Ukrainian footballers
FC Nyva Ternopil players
FC Dynamo Khmelnytskyi players
FC Enerhiya Nova Kakhovka players
Toronto Atomic FC players
Canadian Soccer League (1998–present) players
Association football defenders
FC Continentals players
FC Ukraine United players
Ukrainian expatriate footballers
Ukrainian expatriate sportspeople in Canada
Expatriate soccer players in Canada
Ukrainian Second League players